The 2001–02 NSW Premier League season was the second season of the revamped NSW Premier League. From the original ten teams in the inaugural version of the Premier League, two more were added for the follow-up tournament. They were Bankstown City Lions and Fairfield Bulls.

The Parramatta Eagles took out the double winning the Championship and the Premiership.

Clubs
Teams promoted from Super League:
(After the end of the 2001 season.)
 Bankstown City Lions
 Fairfield Bulls

Teams relegated to Super League:
(After the end of the 2000–01 season.)
 Nil

Regular season

League table

Results

Finals series

Qualifying Finals

Semi-finals

Preliminary final

Grand final

See also
NSW Premier League
Football NSW

References

External links
NSW Premier League Official website

NSW Premier League Season, 2001–02
New South Wales Premier League seasons
Nsw Premier League Season, 2001–02